Alistair Love (born 22 August 1991) is a Scottish professional footballer who plays as a winger for Scottish League Two side Dumbarton. Love has previously played for St Mirren, East Stirlingshire, Annan Athletic, Albion Rovers, Brechin City and Clyde, as well as Stenhousemuir on loan.

Career
Love began his career with St Mirren, where he also spent a loan spell at Stenhousemuir. On 13 May 2011 it was announced that Love would be one of 10 players leaving St. Mirren at the end of the 2010–11 season.

In July 2011 he signed a one-month contract with East Stirlingshire.

After a spell with Annan Athletic, Love signed for Albion Rovers in May 2014. He scored on his debut for the club on 26 July 2014, as Albion Rovers defeated local rivals Airdrieonians 4–2 on penalties following a 2–2 draw in the Scottish Challenge Cup. After two seasons with the Wee Rovers, Love signed for fellow Scottish League One side Brechin City in May 2016.

Love signed with Scottish League Two club Clyde on 1 January 2018, until summer 2019. Love was given a five-game ban for "excessive misconduct" by the Scottish Football Association after being found guilty of racially abusing Annan Athletic player Rabin Omar during Love's first appearance for Clyde. On 3 May 2022, it was announced that Love was one of ten players released by the club following the end of the 2021–22 season. He joined Dumbarton in May 2022 scoring his first goals for the club in a 2-1 victory against Elgin City on August 27, that secured the best start to a season in the club's 150 year history.

Personal life
His brother Robert was also a footballer, playing for Stenhousemuir and Albion Rovers.

Career statistics

References

External links
 (East Stirlingshire, Albion Rovers, Brechin City and Clyde)
 (St Mirren, Stenhousemuir and Annan Athletic)

1991 births
Living people
Scottish footballers
St Mirren F.C. players
Stenhousemuir F.C. players
East Stirlingshire F.C. players
Annan Athletic F.C. players
Albion Rovers F.C. players
Brechin City F.C. players
Clyde F.C. players
Scottish Premier League players
Scottish Football League players
Scottish Professional Football League players
Association football forwards
Association football wingers
Dumbarton F.C. players